John Leroy Gustafson (born January 19, 1955) is an American computer scientist and businessman, chiefly known for his work in high-performance computing (HPC) such as the invention of Gustafson's law, introducing the first commercial computer cluster, measuring with QUIPS, leading the reconstruction of the Atanasoff–Berry computer, inventing the unum number format and computation system, and several awards for computer speedup. Currently he is the Chief Technology Officer at Ceranovo, Inc. He was the Chief Graphics Product Architect and Senior Fellow at AMD from September 2012 until June 2013, and he previously held the positions of Architect of Intel Labs-SC, CEO of Massively Parallel Technologies, Inc. and CTO at ClearSpeed Technology. Gustafson holds applied mathematics degrees from the California Institute of Technology and Iowa State University.

Childhood and education
Gustafson was raised in Des Moines, Iowa. After completing a degree in Applied Mathematics at California Institute of Technology in 1977 he moved to Ames, Iowa and completed his M.S. (1981) and Ph.D. (1982) at Iowa State University.

His mother was an electronics technician at Collins Radio and his father was a chemical engineer turned MD, both as a result of World War II. His parents encouraged his scientific explorations at a young age. Assembling radio transmitters, designing and executing chemistry experiments, and making holograms are some of his favorite childhood explorations.

Unums
Gustafson has devised a new format for storing real numbers in computers use a variable number of bits depending on the number of digits required, called unum number format. Normal formats store numbers as a fixed number of bits, for example 64 bits is usual for double-precision floating-point format numbers.  This can allow them to be smaller than doubles for fast processing and also more precise or larger than the limits for double when desirable.

Awards and honors

In 1988, Gustafson was the recipient of the inaugural Gordon Bell Prize. He has received other awards for his work in HPC, including the International Atanasoff Award (2006). He was awarded the IEEE Computer Society Golden Core Award in 2007.

Other awards and honors include:

 2000 Iowa State University Inventor of the Year Award
 1998 Distinguished Visiting Professor, New Mexico State University
 1997 PDPTA Outstanding Achievement Award
 1995 R&D 100 Award
 1991 R&D 100 Award
 1990 New Mexico Inventor of the Year Award
 1989 R&D 100 Award
 1977 Richter Fellowship
 1974 Eric Temple Bell Award
 1973 Drake Physics Prize

References

External links
Links to papers published while at Ames Lab
 Posithub.org: The one-stop hub for all unum and posit materials
John L. Gustafson Website

1955 births
Living people
American computer businesspeople
American computer scientists
Computer hardware engineers
IBM Fellows
Businesspeople from Des Moines, Iowa
Iowa State University alumni
California Institute of Technology alumni
American technology chief executives
American chief technology officers
Inventors from Iowa